The Willimantic Post Office is a former post office located in Willimantic, Connecticut. The post office was built between 1910 and 1912, and was used until 1966; when a new post office was built a block away. The Willimantic Brewing Company purchased the building in 1997 and converted it into a pub.

References 

Former post office buildings
Government buildings completed in 1912
1912 establishments in Connecticut
Beer brewing companies based in Connecticut
Willimantic, Connecticut